Baksy may refer to:

 A 2008 film by Gulshat Omarova
 Slang for United States dollar